Wu Xiubo (born 5 September 1968), is a Chinese actor, musician and producer. He is most widely known as Xinjie Liu, the protagonist in the television series Before the Dawn, for which he received several awards.

Wu ranked 43rd on Forbes China Celebrity 100 list in 2013, 29th in 2014, 33rd in 2015, 26th in 2017, and 26th in 2019.

Early life
Wu was born and raised in Beijing, China. His mother is a pharmacist, and his father, who died in 2007, was a diplomat. Wu Xiubo has one older step-brother who is a physicist.

As a teenager, Wu became involved in the arts, particularly painting, drawing, poetry, and singing. In 1984, he enrolled at Central Academy of Drama at the age of 17, from which he graduated in 1987.  As a young man, he worked an assortment of jobs, running a restaurant and clothing shop and even working as a resident singer, among other things. Wu joked that he has worked 200 different jobs just to make a living. He also joined a state-owned theater company but found the life routine tedious.

Career
In 2002, Wu was encouraged to return to acting with the help and recommendation of a childhood friend Liu Bei. He made his television drama debut as a detective in the series Crime Investigate at the end of 2002.

Wu first drew attention for his performance in the war drama Sword & Spy, which won him the Most Popular Actor award at the TVS Award Ceremony.

He rose to fame in 2010 when his role as an undercover Communist Party member in hit spy drama Before Dawn became a household name. The same year, he starred in the historical drama The Case of an Orphan named Zhao, written based on true events during the Spring and Autumn Period (770 – 476 BC) where Cheng (played by Wu) rescues an orphan from the Zhao family and saves him from assassination. Wu was nominated for an International Emmy Award for Best Actor.

In 2012, he starred in the hit medical drama Angel Heart, based on best-selling writer Liu Liu's novel about problems in doctor-patient relationships in China.

In 2013, he starred in the romantic comedy film Finding Mr. Right alongside Tang Wei, which was a box office hit and Wu became famous across China as the country's "stylish uncle".

His success continued in 2014 when he starred in Divorce Lawyer, a hit legal drama, where Wu played a divorce lawyer trying to adjust to his new life after his wife's betrayal and the loss of his divorce case. The same year, he starred in the A Civic Yuppie in Countryside, a rural drama about an urban official's experiences in rural China. The drama was praised for its intricate plot, realistic touch and vivid characters and became a ratings hit in China. Wu won the Outstanding Actor award at the Flying Apsaras Awards for his performance.

Wu also starred in the musical television series My Youth High Eight Degrees, playing a club director who leads a gang of misfits with hidden musical talents, whipping them into shape and competing in the national choir competition. Despite achieving stellar ratings, the show was slammed for plagiarism accusations.

In 2015, Wu starred in the historical drama Tumultuous Times Scholar, which focuses on the vicissitudes of a traditional Chinese family of scholars.

Wu and Tang then teamed up again to film the sequel of Finding Mr. Right, titled Book of Love (2016). Book of Love was a huge commercial success and became the highest grossing Chinese romantic film of all time.

In 2017, Wu played Sima Yi in the historical drama The Advisors Alliance. The series was a hit and received high praise for its plot, cinematography and performance of the cast. Wu ranked on Forbes China Celebrity 100 list in 2017.

In 2018, Wu will star alongside Angelababy in the urban drama City of Desire, about two people of different world helping each other out of their battle with depression.

Personal life
Wu married in 2002 when he was 34. He and his wife live in Beijing with their two sons Hanhan (born 2003) and Xiaoyu (born 2007). Wu is an avid billiards enthusiast.

In 2011, Wu was awarded at the Culture China Award ceremony hosted by the Oriental Morning Post for his outstanding contributions to the Chinese culture in the past 10 years. In 2012, he was awarded the 2012 China Youth Leader Awards organized by the Guangzhou-based magazine Southern People Weekly, which identifies and recognizes model youths who excel or inspire their peers to make contributions to society.

In 2014, PETA named him as Asia's Sexiest Male Vegetarian Celebrity.

In 2017, Wu was appointed Tourism Australia's Ambassador for the 2017 China-Australia Year of Tourism.

In September 2018, Chinese actress Ruby Chen declared on her social media account that she had been in a seven-year relationship with Wu. In January 2019, Chen's parents revealed that their daughter had been arrested by the police for blackmailing Wu, resulting in Wu receiving much flak for his "un-gentlemanly" handling of the extramarital affair. Wu  was officially banned from acting for three years after Chen went public with their affair in 2018. The scandal delayed significantly the 2019 Chinese New Year release of the movie Some Like It Hot 2 in which he was a lead.

Filmography

Film

Television series

Discography

Albums

Singles

Awards and nominations

References

External links

Living people
1968 births
Central Academy of Drama alumni
Musicians from Beijing
Male actors from Beijing
Chinese male singers
Chinese male film actors
Chinese male television actors
21st-century Chinese male actors